Bihari is a group of the Indo-Aryan languages. The Bihari languages are mainly spoken in the Indian states of Bihar, Jharkhand, West Bengal and Uttar Pradesh and also in Nepal. The most widely spoken languages of the Bihari group are Bhojpuri, Magahi and Maithili.

Despite the large number of speakers of these languages, only Maithili has been constitutionally recognised in India, which gained constitutional status via the 92nd amendment to the Constitution of India, of 2003 (gaining assent in 2004). Both Maithili and Bhojpuri have constitutional recognition in Nepal. Bhojpuri is also official in Fiji as Fiji Baat. There are demands for including Bhojpuri in the 8th schedule of Indian constitution. 

In Bihar, Hindi is the language used for educational and official matters. These languages were legally absorbed under the overarching label Hindi in the 1961 Census. Such state and national politics are creating conditions for language endangerments. After independence Hindi was given the sole official status through the Bihar Official Language Act, 1950. Hindi was displaced as the sole official language of Bihar in 1981, when Urdu was accorded the status of the second official language.

Speakers 

The number of speakers of Bihari languages is difficult to indicate because of unreliable sources. In the urban region most educated speakers of the language name Hindi as their language because this is what they use in formal contexts and believe it to be the appropriate response because of unawareness. The educated and the urban population of the region return Hindi as the generic name for their language.

Classification

The Bihari languages fall into four language subgroups:

Bihari
Bhojpuri
Nagpuriya Bhojpuri
Tharu Bhojpuri
Mauritian Bhojpuri
Caribbean Hindustani
Fiji Baat
South African Bhojpuri (Naitali)
 Magahi  
 Maithili 
Begushoraiya Maithili
Bajjika (Western Maithili)
Angika (Southern Maithili)
Standard Maithili (Central Maithili) 
Eastern Maithili
Thēthi
Jolaha
Kisan
Khortha
Sadanic
Nagpuri (Sadri)
Kurmali
Panchpargania
Tharuic
Chitwania Tharu
Dangaura Tharu
Sonha
Kathoriya Tharu
Kochila Tharu
Rana Tharu
Buksa
Majhi
Musasa
Unclassified Bihari
 Kumhali
 Kuswaric
Danwar
Bote-Darai

Languages and dialects

References and footnotes

External links 

 A Comparative dictionary of the Bihārī language, Volume 1 By August Friedrich Rudolf Hoernle, Sir George Abraham Grierson (1885)
 Documentation for ISO 639 identifier: bih, on www.sil.org
 Nalanda Open University offers courses on Bihari languages (Magahi, Bhojpuri, Maithili)
 Angika Language Wikipedia (incubator)

 
Languages of India
Culture of Bihar
Eastern Indo-Aryan languages
Languages of Nepal